Wilma Louise Victor (November 5, 1919 – November 15, 1987) was a Choctaw educator.

She was born in Idabel, Oklahoma on November 5, 1919. A friend of hers was employed at the Federal Bureau of Indian Affairs (BIA) and arranged for her to receive a scholarship to attend the University of Kansas for two years. BIA education director Willard Beatty encouraged her to enter a career in teaching and helped her get a scholarship for the Milwaukee State Teachers College, where she received her Bachelor of Science degree.

Victor started her career as an apprentice teacher at Shiprock Boarding School in Shiprock, New Mexico.

Victor enlisted in the Army in 1943 and served in the Women's Army Corps during World War II. She served as a first lieutenant until 1946. She taught at Idabel High School for two years. After that she secured a teaching position Intermountain Indian School, an off-reservation boarding school in Brigham City, Utah.

Victor taught at Intermountain for 13 years and co-founded the Institute of American Indian Arts. She was named Principal of the institute in 1962. She spearheaded the development of the institution's curriculum, which had a focus on Native art traditions. She was promoted to superintendent of Intermountain Indian School on April 7, 1964.

She worked at the Intermountain Indian School from 1940 to 1960 and from 1964 to 1970.

From 1961 to 1964, Victor was principal of Santa Fe's Institute of American Indian Arts.

Victor was one of six women selected a Federal Woman's Award in 1967. She was recognized for her "exceptional creative and executive ability in the administration of a unique and complex school program for disadvantaged Indian youth". Victor was also a member of the Council for Exceptional Children, the Utah State Conference on Social Welfare, and the Governor of Utah's Commission on Indian Affairs. She was recipient of the Indian Achievement Award in 1970. The State of Utah also named Victor one of "seven women of the 70s." At the first National Indian Workshop for Indian Affairs she was a keynote speaker.

In 1971, Victor was appointed special assistant to Secretary of the Interior Rogers Morton.  At the time, she was the highest ranking Native American woman in government. She advised the secretary on Indian affairs.

Victor died on November 15, 1987 in Idabel.

References

Further reading
Women in the Federal Government Oral History Project. Interviews, 1981-1983: A Finding Aid

External links
Statement by Wilma L. Victor on her Appointment by Secretary the Interior Morton as Special Assistant to the Secretary for Indian Affairs. Department of the Interior. March 29, 1971.

1919 births
1987 deaths
School superintendents in Utah
Choctaw Nation of Oklahoma people
American school principals
20th-century American women educators
Female United States Army officers
Women's Army Corps soldiers
Oklahoma Republicans
Native American women in politics
People from Idabel, Oklahoma
20th-century American educators
20th-century Native Americans
20th-century Native American women
Women school principals and headteachers